Alexey Logvinovich Overchuk (born 9 December 1964) is a Russian politician serving as Deputy Prime Minister of Russia for Eurasian integration, cooperation with the Commonwealth of Independent States, BRICS, G20, and international events since 21 January 2020.

Early life and career 
Alexey Overchuk was born on 9 December 1964 in Korostyshiv, Zhytomyr Oblast, in what is now Ukraine. In 1986, he graduated from the K.A. Timiryazev Moscow Agricultural Academy, specialising in economic cybernetics. In 1992, he defended his PhD thesis on "Organisation of management of cooperative form of farming in industrial agriculture" at the K.A. Timiryazev Moscow Academy of Agriculture, PhD in Economics.

From 1994 to 1998, he was deputy head of the international department of the presidential administration.

Cadastral and economic career 
Since 1998, head of the department of state registration of real estate rights at the State Committee for Land Resources and Land Management (Roskomzem).

From August 2000, he was Deputy Head of the Russian Federal Land Cadastre Service (Roszemkadastr), which was reorganised into the Federal Service for State Registration, Cadastre and Cartography in 2004.

In 2007, he became deputy head of the Federal Agency for Management of Special Economic Zones under Mikhail Mishustin, coordinating work to attract investors. Since March 2011 he has been deputy head of the Federal Tax Service. He coordinated and supervised the activities of the Department of Standards and International Cooperation.

Deputy Prime Minister 
Since 21 January 2020, he has been Deputy Prime Minister of Russia. Originally, Overchuk was intended to oversee IT issues, but these were distributed among other deputy prime ministers. His responsibilities in government include Eurasian integration, cooperation with international organisations (CIS, BRICS, G20, etc.) and planning and organising international events with the Prime Minister.

Sanctions
In December 2022 the EU sanctioned Alexey Overchuk in relation to the 2022 Russian invasion of Ukraine.

Notes

References 

1964 births
Living people
People from Korostyshiv
21st-century Russian politicians
Deputy heads of government of the Russian Federation